Adam E. Kowalczyk (born September 27, 1975) is an American musician. He is the brother of Ed Kowalczyk, lead singer of the band Live.

Biography
Kowalczyk was born in York, Pennsylvania to a family of Polish descent. He began learning the guitar at age 12. While studying in the Radio, Television and Film program at Philadelphia's Temple University, he started writing songs and performing with his first band, Portion. Portion recorded two extended plays and opened for Live and other bands.

In 1999, Adam began playing as the touring rhythm guitarist for Live, a position which he held for 10 years. He appeared as a guest musician on the Live albums The Distance to Here and V and was featured in the band's only concert DVD release, Live at the Paradiso – Amsterdam. During his time with Live, Kowalczyk relocated to Los Angeles and formed the band Adam & the Weight, which released the album Looking Up from the Ground in 2003. By 2005, he was living in Lancaster, Pennsylvania and had recorded a solo EP, The Dream.

In January 2011, Adam became lead singer of the Lancaster-based band The Mint.

Discography

 Looking Up from the Ground (2003)
 The Dream EP (2005)

References

External links

1975 births
Alternative rock guitarists
American alternative rock musicians
American people of Polish descent
American rock guitarists
American male guitarists
Live (band) members
Living people
Musicians from Lancaster, Pennsylvania
Musicians from York, Pennsylvania
Rhythm guitarists
Temple University alumni
Guitarists from Los Angeles
Guitarists from Pennsylvania